The 1980 World Sportscar Championship season was the 28th season of FIA World Sportscar Championship motor racing.  It featured the 1980 World Championship for Makes which was contested as a series running under both Fédération Internationale de l'Automobile (FIA) and International Motor Sports Association (IMSA) regulations. It ran from 2 February 1980 to 28 September 1980, and comprised 11 races, including races run with Camel GT Championship.

A World Challenge for Endurance Drivers was also held over an eleven-round series, six of which were run concurrently with rounds of the World Championship for Makes. The Challenge was not awarded World Championship status, but would be promoted the following season and join the Championship for Makes.

The 16 combined events made for one of the most gruelling and varied championships in the history of motor racing. Some events, notably Le Mans and Daytona featured prototype sports cars. Others like the second shorter Daytona race and the Spa 24 Hour were touring car events with the rest consisting mostly of Grand Touring sportscars. Some of the European races featured Sports 2000 open bodied sports cars, but nothing larger than two litres engine capacity. No single driver started more than ten of the 16 races, with the Monza 1000 and the Riverside 5 Hour both occurring on the same day (and strangely both events counting towards the drivers title) no driver could attempt all 16. With over 1100 drivers competing it was one of the largest entries in the history of the sport.

The World Championship of Makes was contested in two classes, under and over 2000 cc of engine capacity. At the end of the championship Lancia and Porsche had won the two classes respectively with the same pointscore. The tie was broken in favour of Lancia, a fitting reward for the Italian manufacturer who had fielded a factory team of two or three Lancia Montecarlos across the European races featuring Formula One drivers and World Rally Champions like Riccardo Patrese, Eddie Cheever, Michele Alboreto, Piercarlo Ghinzani, Walter Röhrl and Markku Alén, as well as providing support to the Jolly Club team's Montecarlo who made trips to North America when the factory team did not.

In the World Endurance Challenge, only three drivers competed in ten races over the season and two of them were rewarded with first and second in the Challenge. American John Paul, Sr. won the series despite collecting only one win, the final race; the Road America 500 co-driving with his son, John Paul Jr. in their Porsche 935. Paul raced a variety of Porsches, 935s and a 930 as well as a Mazda RX-3 at the 6 Hours of Daytona touring car race. British driver John Fitzpatrick was just five points behind Paul at seasons finish despite taking three race wins at Sebring, Riverside and Mosport. He had used Porsche 935s and an AMC Spirit in his championship chase. Porsche 935 and Mazda RX-3 racer Dick Barbour finished third, four points behind Fitzpatrick.

Two drivers lost their lives during the season. Martin Raymond was killed in a Chevron B36 at Brands Hatch and Manuel Quintana died in a qualifying accident at Sebring in his Porsche 911.

Schedule
The following 16 races made up the 1980 World Championship for Makes and World Challenge for Endurance Drivers.

Season results
Although a multitude of classes contended for the Championship for Makes, only the overall race winners are listed here.

Although a multitude of classes contended for the World Challenge for Endurance Drivers, only the overall race winners are listed here.

World Championship for Makes - Results
The World Championship for Makes was only open to select categories of cars.  This included the FIA's Group 5 Special Production Cars, Group 4 Grand Touring Cars, Group 3 Series Production Grand Touring Cars, Group 2 Touring Cars, and Group 1 Series Production Touring Cars.  An overall championship was awarded as well as two class titles: Division 1, for cars over 2000 cc and Division 2 for those under 2000 cc.

Points were awarded to the top ten finishers in each division in the order of 20-15-12-10-8-6-4-3-2-1, with only the best eight results out of the eleven races being counted. Only the best placed entry of each make in each division was eligible to score points, with no points awarded to other placings.

Overall Championship
The overall championship was to be awarded to the make achieving the highest net point score in either Division. The resultant tie between Porsche and Lancia was decided in Lancia's favour due to the greater number of Division victories scored by the Italian make.

Division 1 : Over 2000 cc

Division 2 : Under 2000 cc

World Championship for Makes - The cars
The following models contributed to the net points scored by makes in the 1980 championship.

Division 1
 Porsche 935
 Lancia Montecarlo
 Ferrari 512BB
 BMW M1
 Opel Monza

Division 2
 Lancia Montecarlo
 BMW 320i
 Porsche 935
 Fiat X1/9
 Ford Escort RS 2000
 Opel Kadett

World Challenge for Endurance Drivers - Results
The World Challenge for Endurance Drivers was won by John Paul Sr. from John Fitzpatrick and Brian Redman.

References

External links
 1980 World Championship For Makes - race results
 World Championship image galleries

World Sportscar Championship seasons
World Sportscar Championship